Nana F. Foulland (born October 21, 1995) is an American professional basketball player for Boulazac Basket Dordogne of LNB Pro B. He played college basketball for Bucknell University, where he was named Patriot League Player of the Year and Patriot Defensive Player of the Year in 2017.

Early life and college career
Foulland attended Berks Catholic High School in Reading, Pennsylvania. He committed to play college basketball for the Bucknell Bison.

As a freshman at Bucknell, he was named to the Patriot League All-Rookie Team. In his sophomore season, Foulland averaged 11.8 points and 6.9 points per game and was named second-team all-Patriot League.

At the close of his junior season, Foulland was named Patriot League Player of the Year, conference Defensive Player of the Year and an honorable mention All-American by the Associated Press. Foulland led the Bison to conference regular season and tournament championships and a berth in the 2017 NCAA tournament.

Prior to the start of the 2017–18 season, Foulland was picked to repeat as Patriot League Player of the Year as Bucknell was picked to repeat as Patriot League champions. He was also named to the preseason Karl Malone Award watch list. On December 22, 2017, Foulland scored a career-high 30 points in a win over La Salle, shooting 12–15 from the floor.

Following his senior season, Foulland was again named First-Team All-Patriot League.

Professional career

After going undrafted in the 2018 NBA draft, Foulland joined the Minnesota Timberwolves for the 2018 NBA Summer League.

On July 26, 2018, Foulland signed a two-year deal with Ironi Nahariya of the Israeli Premier League. In 14 games played for Nahariya, he averaged 8.1 points and 6.6 rebounds per game, shooting 59 percent from the field.

On March 1, 2019, Foulland parted ways with Nahariya to join U BT Cluj-Napoca of the Romanian Liga Națională, signing for the rest of the season.

On August 27, 2019, he signed with Trefl Sopot of PLK. Foulland averaged 12.4 points and 8.8 rebounds per game. On August 22, 2020, he signed with Amici Pallacanestro Udinese in Italy. Foulland averaged 10.8 points, 8.9 rebounds, and 1.4 assists per game. On August 6, 2021, he signed with Boulazac Basket Dordogne of LNB Pro B.

References

External links
Bucknell Bison bio
RealGM profile
College stats

1995 births
Living people
21st-century African-American sportspeople
African-American basketball players
American expatriate basketball people in Israel
American expatriate basketball people in Poland
American expatriate basketball people in Romania
American men's basketball players
Basketball players from New York City
Basketball players from Pennsylvania
Boulazac Basket Dordogne players
Bucknell Bison men's basketball players
Centers (basketball)
CS Universitatea Cluj-Napoca (men's basketball) players
Ironi Nahariya players
Sportspeople from Reading, Pennsylvania
Trefl Sopot players